The General Secretary-Treasurer is an elected position in the Industrial Workers of the World (IWW). The IWW is a revolutionary labor union based in Chicago, Illinois, United States. Based in Chicago, the IWW operates in various countries around the world, including Canada, Great Britain, Australia, and elsewhere. Below is a list of those who held the position as General Secretary-Treasurer from the union's founding in 1905 to present day.

List

 
 William E. Trautmann  July 1905Dec 1908
 Vincent St. John   Jan 1909Dec 1914
 William D. Haywood   Jan 1915Sept 1917
 Fred Hardy (acting)  Oct 1917Feb 1918
 William D. Haywood*   Feb 1918Dec 1918
 Peter Stone (acting)   JanMar 9, 1919
 Thomas Whitehead   Mar  10, 1919Aug 1920
 George Hardy   Sept 1920July 1921
 John Grady   July 1921Nov 1922
 E. W. Latchem  (Pro Tem)  Dec 1922Feb 1923
 Jack Gillis  March 1 1923June 30 1923
 Harry G. Clark (Pro Tem)  July 1 1923Nov 1923
 Axel W. Sodling  Nov 10 1923Nov 17 1923
 Sam Forbes (Pro Tem)  Nov 24 1923Feb 1924
 Tom Doyle  Mar 1, 1924Oct 17, 1924
 Ed Fahey  (Pro Tem) Oct 18, 1924Nov. 16, 1924
 P.J. Welinder  (Pro Tem)  Nov 17, 1924Feb 1925
 Arthur Coleman   Mar 1 1925Feb 1926
 John I. Turner Mar 1926Feb 1927
 Lee Tulin  Mar 1927Feb 1930
 James Sullivan Mar 1930Feb 1931
 Herbert Mahler Mar 1931Nov 1932
 Joseph Wagner Dec 1932Feb 1936
 Fred W. Thompson  Mar 1936Feb 1937
 Walter H. Westman  Mar 1937Dec 1939
 Joseph Wagner* Jan 1940Dec 1940
 Walter H. Westman*  Jan 1941Dec 1946
 W.A. Unger  Jan 1947Dec 1947
 A.J. Farley Jan 1948Dec 1948
 Walter H. Westman*  Jan 1949Dec 1964
 Carl Keller Jan 1965Apr 1969
 Allan H. Just May 1969Jul 1970
 Lionel Bottari Aug 1970Dec 1971
 Patrick Murfin Jan 1972Jul 1972
 Goddard C. Graves Jul 1972Dec 1972
 Michael D. Brown Jan 1973Dec 1973
 Craig Ledford Jan 1974Dec 1975
 Kathleen L. Taylor Jan 1976Dec 1977
 Michael Hargis Jan 1978Dec 1980
 Carol F. Mason Jan 1981Aug 1981
 Dan Pless  Sep 1981Dec 1981
 Mary H. Frohman  Jan 1982Dec 1982
 Dave Tucker Jan 1983Dec 1983
 Jon Bekken  Jan 1984Aug 1984
 Rochelle Semel  Sep 1984Nov 1984
 Jon Bekken*  Dec 1984Dec 1985
 Mark Kaufman Jan 1986Dec 1986
 Penny Pixler  Jan 1987Dec 1987
 Paul Poulos  Jan 1988Dec 1988
 Jeff Ditz Jan 1989Dec 1990
 Jess Grant Jan 1991Dec 1992
 Harry Siitonen  Jan 1993Dec 1993
 Robert Rush Jan 1994Dec 1994
 Fred Chase Jan 1995Dec 1999
 Alexis Buss Jan 2000Dec 2005
 Mark E. Damron Jan 2006Dec 2008
 Chris Lytle Jan 2009Dec 2009
 Joe Tessone Jan 2010Dec 2011
 Samuel Green Jan 2012Dec 2013
 Monika Vykoukal Jan 2014Dec 2014
 Randall Jamrok Jan 2015Dec 2016
 Arella Vargas Jan 2017Dec 2017
 Travis Erickson Jan 2018Dec 2019
 J. Cameron Mancini Jan 2020Dec 2021
 Kelsey Tanabe-Walker Jan 2022Present

References

Industrial Workers of the World
Leaders of organizations